Ilkino is a rural locality (a village) in Annovsky Selsoviet, Belebeyevsky District, Bashkortostan, Russia. The population was 417 as of 2010. There are 3 streets.

Geography 
Ilkino is located 11 km north of Belebey (the district's administrative centre) by road. Ismagilovo is the nearest rural locality.

References 

Rural localities in Belebeyevsky District